Kate Douglas Wiggin (September 28, 1856August 24, 1923) was an American educator, author and composer. She wrote children's stories, most notably the classic children's novel Rebecca of Sunnybrook Farm, and composed collections of children's songs. She started the first free kindergarten in San Francisco in 1878 (the Silver Street Free Kindergarten). With her sister during the 1880s, she also established a training school for kindergarten teachers. Kate Wiggin devoted her adult life to the welfare of children in an era when children were commonly thought of as cheap labor.

Wiggin went to California to study kindergarten methods. She began to teach in San Francisco with her sister Nora assisting her, and the two were instrumental in the establishment of over 60 kindergartens for the poor in San Francisco and Oakland. She moved from California to New York, and having no kindergarten work on hand, devoted herself to literature. She sent The Story of Patsy and The Bird's Christmas Carol to Houghton, Mifflin & Co. who accepted them at once. Besides the talent for story-telling, she was a musician, sang well, and composed settings for her poems. She was also an excellent elocutionist. Her first literary work was Half a Dozen Housekeepers, a serial story which she sent to St. Nicholas. After the death of her husband in 1889, she returned to California to resume her kindergarten work, serving as the head of a Kindergarten Normal School. Some of her other works included Cathedral Courtship, A Summer in a Canon, Timothy's Quest, The Story Hour, Kindergarten Chimes, Polly Oliver's Problem, and Children's Rights.

Early life

Kate Douglas Smith Wiggin was born in Philadelphia, the daughter of lawyer Robert N. Smith, and of Welsh descent. Kate experienced a happy childhood, even though it was colored by the American Civil War and her father's death. Kate and her sister Nora were still quite young when their widowed mother moved her little family from Philadelphia to Portland, Maine, then, three years later, upon her remarriage, to the little village of Hollis. There Kate matured in rural surroundings, with her sister and her new baby brother Philip.

Notably, she once met the novelist Charles Dickens. Her mother and another relative had gone to hear Dickens read in Portland, but Wiggin, aged 11, was thought to be too young to warrant an expensive ticket. The following day, she found herself on the same train as Dickens and engaged him in a lively conversation for the course of the journey, an experience which she later detailed in a short memoir titled A Child's Journey with Dickens (1912).

Her education was spotty, consisting of a short stint at a dame school, some home schooling under the "capable, slightly impatient, somewhat sporadic" instruction of Albion Bradbury (her stepfather), a brief spell at the district school, a year as a boarder at the Gorham Female Seminary, a winter term at Morison Academy in Baltimore, Maryland, and a few months' stay at Abbot Academy in Andover, Massachusetts, where she graduated with the class of 1873.  Although rather casual, this was more education than most women received at the time.

Early career
In 1873, hoping to ease Albion Bradbury's lung disease, Kate's family moved to Santa Barbara, California, where Kate's stepfather died three years later. A kindergarten training class was opening in Los Angeles under Emma Marwedel (1818–1893), and Kate enrolled. After graduation, in 1878, she headed the first free kindergarten in California, on Silver Street in the slums of San Francisco. The children were "street Arabs of the wildest type", but Kate had a loving personality and dramatic flair. By 1880 she was forming a teacher-training school in conjunction with the Silver Street kindergarten.

In 1881, Kate married (Samuel) Bradley Wiggin, a San Francisco lawyer. According to the customs of the time, she was required to resign her teaching job. Still devoted to her school, she began to raise money for it through writing, first The Story of Patsy (1883), then The Birds' Christmas Carol (1887). Both privately printed books were issued commercially by Houghton Mifflin in 1889, with enormous success.

Kate Wiggin had no children. She moved to New York City in 1888. When her husband died suddenly in 1889, Kate relocated to Maine. For the rest of her life she grieved, but she also traveled as frequently as she could, dividing her time between writing, visits to Europe, and giving public reading for the benefit of various children's charities.

Wiggin traveled abroad and back from Liverpool in the United Kingdom at least three times. Records from the Ellis Island logs show that she arrived back in New York City from Liverpool in October 1892, July 1893, and July 1894. On the logs for the 1892 trip, Wiggin describes her occupation as "Wife", despite her former husband dying three years prior. In 1893 and 1894, she describes herself as an "Authoress".

Wiggin met dry goods (specifically, linen) importer George Christopher Riggs on her way to England in 1894. The pair are said to have hit it off and had agreed to marry even before the ship docked in England. In the Ellis Island logs from Wiggin's 1894 trip back to New York City from Liverpool, the two sign their names next to each other, indicating their closeness. The pair married in New York City on March 30, 1895, at All Souls Church. George Riggs soon became one of Wiggin's biggest advocates as she became more successful.

After the marriage she continued to write under the name of Wiggin. Her literary output included popular books for adults; with her sister, Nora A. Smith, she published scholarly work on the educational principles of Friedrich Fröbel: Froebel's Gifts (1895), Froebel's Occupations (1896), and Kindergarten Principles and Practice (1896); and she wrote the classic children's novel Rebecca of Sunnybrook Farm (1903), as well as the 1905 best-seller Rose o' the River. Rebecca of Sunnybrook Farm became an immediate bestseller; both it and Mother Carey's Chickens (1911) were adapted to the stage. Houghton Mifflin collected her writings in 10 volumes in 1917.

For a time, she lived at Quillcote, her summer home in Hollis, Maine (now listed on the National Register of Historic Places). Quillcote is around the corner from the town's library, the Salmon Falls Library, which Wiggin founded in 1911.  Wiggin founded the Dorcas Society of Hollis & Buxton, Maine in 1897.  The Tory Hill Meeting House in the adjacent town of Buxton, Maine inspired her book (and later play) The Old Peabody Pew (1907).

Later life and death
Wiggin was an active and popular hostess in New York and in the community of Upper Largo, Scotland, where she had a summer home and where she organized plays for many years, as detailed in her memoir My Garden of Memory.

In 1921, Wiggin and her sister Nora Archibald Smith edited an edition of Jane Porter's The Scottish Chiefs, an 1809 novel of William Wallace, for the Scribner's Illustrated Classics series, illustrated by N.C. Wyeth. During the spring of 1923, Kate Wiggin traveled to England as a New York delegate to the Dickens Fellowship. There she became ill and died, at age 66, of bronchial pneumonia. At her request, her ashes were brought home to Maine and scattered over the Saco River. Her autobiography, My Garden of Memory, was published after her death. In sorting through material for her autobiography, she put many items in a box she and her sister labelled "posthumous". Her sister Nora A. Smith later published her own reminiscences, titled Kate Douglas Wiggin as her Sister Knew Her, from these materials.

Wiggin was also a songwriter and composer. For "Kindergarten Chimes" (1885) and other collections for children, she wrote some of the lyrics, music, and arrangements. For "Nine Love Songs and a Carol" (1896), she composed all of the music.

Legacy

In the 1980s and 1990s, Wiggin's first husband's distant cousin, Eric E. Wiggin, published updated versions of some books in Kate Douglas Wiggin's Rebecca of Sunnybrook Farm series. He later published his own addition to the series, entitled, Rebecca Returns to Sunnybrook. Eric E. Wiggin extended Kate Douglas Wiggin's series after years of writing Christian literature, newspaper articles, and other children's books. Eric E. Wiggin's books sold best among his target audience of homeschoolers; with their help, his updated novels and his new addition to the series have sold more than 50,000 copies.

Many of Kate Douglas Wiggin's novels were made into movies. Perhaps the most famous film adaptation of her books is the 1938 film, which stars Shirley Temple.

Selected works

 The Story of Patsy (1883)
 The Birds' Christmas Carol (1887)
 Timothy's Quest (1890), illustrated by Oliver Herford
 Polly Oliver's Problem (1893)
 A Cathedral Courtship, and Penelope's English Experiences (1893)
 The Village Watch-Tower (1895)
 Penelope's Progress (1898)
 Penelope's Travels in Scotland (1898)
 Penelope's Irish Experiences (1901)
 The Diary of a Goose Girl (1902), illus. Claude A. Shepperson
 Rebecca of Sunnybrook Farm (1903)
 Half-a-Dozen Housekeepers (1903)
 Rose o' the River (1905)
 New Chronicles of Rebecca (1907)
 Homespun Tales (1907)
 The Old Peabody Pew (1907)
 Susanna and Sue (1909)
 Mother Carey's Chickens (1911)
 Robinetta (1911)
 A Child's Journey with Dickens (1912)
 The Story of Waitstill Baxter (1913)
 The Romance of a Christmas Card (1916)
 A Summer in a Canyon: A California Story (1893)
 Marm Lisa
 My Garden of Memory (autobiography, published posthumously in 1923)

 With Nora A. Smith
 The Story Hour: a book for the home and kindergarten (1890), LCCN 14-19353
 Golden Numbers: a book of verse for youth, eds. (1902), LCCN 02-27230
 The Posy Ring: a book of verse for children, eds. (1903) – "companion volume", LCCN 03-5775
 The Fairy Ring, eds. (1906); truncated as Fairy Stories Every Child Should Know (1942), illus. Elizabeth MacKinstry 
 Magic Casements: A Second Fairy Book, eds. (1907)
 Pinafore Palace: a book of rhymes for the nursery, eds. (1907)
 Tales of Laughter: A Third Fairy Book, eds. (1908)
 The Arabian Nights: their best-known tales, eds. (1909), illus. Maxfield Parrish
 Tales of Wonder: A Fourth Fairy Book, eds. (1909)
 The Talking Beasts: a book of fable wisdom, eds. (1911)
 An Hour with the Fairies (1911)
 Twilight Stories: more tales for the story hour, eds. (1925), LCCN 25-17938
 The Story Hour. A Book for the Home and Kingergarten
 Children's Rights
 The Republic of Childhood (3 volumes)
 Marm Lisa

About Kate Douglas Wiggin
 Kate Douglas Wiggin as Her Sister Knew Her (1925)

Filmography
A Bit o' Heaven (1917), directed by Lule Warrenton, based on the novel The Birds' Christmas Carol
Rebecca of Sunnybrook Farm (1917), starring Mary Pickford, directed by Marshall Neilan (based on the novel Rebecca of Sunnybrook Farm)
Rose o' the River (1919), directed by Robert Thornby (based on the novel Rose o' the River)
Timothy's Quest (1922), directed by Sidney Olcott (based on the story Timothy's Quest)
Rebecca of Sunnybrook Farm (1932), directed by Alfred Santell (based on the novel Rebecca of Sunnybrook Farm)
Timothy's Quest (1936), directed by Charles Barton (based on the story Timothy's Quest)
Rebecca of Sunnybrook Farm (1938), starring Shirley Temple, directed by Allan Dwan (based on the novel Rebecca of Sunnybrook Farm)
Mother Carey's Chickens (1938), directed by Rowland V. Lee (based on the novel Mother Carey's Chickens)
Summer Magic (1963), a Walt Disney production starring Hayley Mills, directed by James Neilson (based on the novel Mother Carey's Chickens)
Christmas World: "The Bird's Christmas Carol" (2019), a Once Upon a Tale Entertainment presentation, directed by James Arrow (uncreditedly, based on the novel The Birds' Christmas Carol)

References

Bibliography

External links

 
 
 
 
 
 
 Bowdoin collection and brief biography
 The Dorcas Society of Hollis & Buxton, Maine
 free online sheet music of Nine Love Songs and a Carol by Kate Douglas Wiggin
 Full text of The Diary of a Goose Girl, Houghton Mifflin Company, 1902.
 Kate Wiggin Papers Dartmouth College Library

1856 births
1923 deaths
Writers from Philadelphia
American children's writers
People from Hollis, Maine
Schoolteachers from California
American women educators
American people of Welsh descent
19th-century American women writers
American women children's writers
20th-century American women writers
19th-century American writers
20th-century American writers
Abbot Academy alumni
Wikipedia articles incorporating text from A Woman of the Century
Elocutionists